Terumo Penpol Limited (TPL) is a subsidiary of Terumo Corp., Japan, and is India's largest blood bag manufacturer. It is also the largest producers of blood bags in Asia, outside Japan.

Origins

The original company - Peninsula Polymers Limited (Penpol Ltd.) - was established in 1987 by C. Balagopal, a former Indian Administrative Service (IAS, 1977 Batch) officer from the Manipur Cadre. It was established as joint venture with Sree Chitra Thirunal Institute of Medical Sciences and Technology and soon became the first company in India to produce blood bags using indigenous technology. In 1989, Penpol started exporting and followed it up it by setting up an R&D centre.

In 1999, Tokyo-based Terumo Corporation signed a contract to acquire a 74% share of Peninsula Polymers Limited, and the new joint venture was renamed as Terumo Penpol Limited (TPL). The stake of financial institutions and other investors bought over by Terumo, leaving only the promoters and itself as shareholders.

Operations

Terumo Penpol has its headquarters in Thiruvananthapuram, Kerala and employs 1200 people. Terumo Penpol Blood Bags are sold in over 64 countries across the world and its medical equipment division has commissioned more than 25000 installations. TPL has entered its 25-year of operations in 2010, with an enhanced production capacity of 22 million blood bags per annum.

TPL has been winning the top exporter award or the second best exporter award for medical disposables every year from 1994 onwards.

References

External links
 Terumo Penpol Ltd.
 Terumo Corporation Japan
 https://cb.hbsp.harvard.edu/cbmp/product/NA0294-PDF-ENG Harvard case study on PENPOL

Companies established in 1987
Biomedical engineering